Vanderveer is a surname. Notable people with the surname include:

Abraham Vanderveer (1781–1839), American politician
Dylan Vanderveer (born 1997), American Division 1 College Golfer and Winner of the 2018 Mt. View City Championship
Elizabeth Donner Vanderveer (born 1876, death unknown), professional name of screenwriter Beta Breuil 
Ellinor Vanderveer (1886–1976), American actress
George Vanderveer (1875–1942), American labor lawyer
Heidi VanDerveer (born 1964), American women's basketball coach
 (1821–1898), American physician
Tara VanDerveer (born 1953), American women's basketball player and coach

See also
Jacobus Vanderveer House, historic house in Bedminster Township, New Jersey, United States
Van der Veer (disambiguation)
Vander Veer (disambiguation)
VanDerVeer Genealogy Database